Nelliston School is a historic school building located at Nelliston, Montgomery County, New York.  It was built in 1869 and is a two-story, square shaped brick institutional building.  It has a shallow pitched gable roof.  It served the educational needs of the community until 1971.

It was added to the National Register of Historic Places in 2002.

References

School buildings on the National Register of Historic Places in New York (state)
Romanesque Revival architecture in New York (state)
School buildings completed in 1869
Schools in Montgomery County, New York
1869 establishments in New York (state)
National Register of Historic Places in Montgomery County, New York